Zeta Cassiopeiae, Latinized from ζ Cassiopeiae, and officially named Fulu , is a variable star in the constellation of Cassiopeia. It has a blue-white hue and is classified as a B-type subgiant with an apparent magnitude of +3.66. Based upon parallax measurements, it is approximately 590 light-years from the Sun.

Nomenclature 

ζ Cassiopeiae (Latinised to Zeta Cassiopeiae) is the star's Bayer designation.

In Chinese astronomy, Zeta Cassiopeiae is called 附路, Pinyin: Fùlù, meaning 	Auxiliary Road, because this star is marking itself and standing alone in the Auxiliary Road asterism, Legs (mansion) (see : Chinese constellation). 附路 (Fùlù) was westernized into Foo Loo, but that name was also designated for Eta Cassiopeiae by R.H. Allen, with the meaning of "a by-path"  In 2016, the IAU organized a Working Group on Star Names (WGSN) to catalog and standardize proper names for stars. The WGSN approved the name Fulu for Zeta Cassiopeiae on 30 June 2017 and it is now so included in the List of IAU-approved Star Names.

Properties 

Zeta Cassiopeiae is a B2 subgiant, indicating that it has exhausted its core hydrogen and started to evolve away from the main sequence. It has a temperature of over 20,000 K, is about eight times the mass of the sun, and is 5,500 times as luminous.

Variability 
Zeta Cassiopeiae is a probable member of an unusual group of variable stars known as "Slowly Pulsating B" (SPB) stars. This likely matches the rotation rate of the star, which, when combined with the low projected rotational velocity, indicates the star may be seen nearly pole-on. Zeta Cassiopeiae is a candidate magnetic Bp star that shows an overabundance of helium. The star contains a randomly oriented fossil magnetic field, which impacts the outflow of the stellar wind. Collisions between streams from this stellar wind creates a shock front, with cooling particles settling toward a co-rotating disk.

References

Cassiopeiae, Zeta
Cassiopeiae, 17
B-type subgiants
Cassiopeia (constellation)
Slowly pulsating B stars
0153
003360
002920
BD+53 0105